"The Best Thing for You (Would Be Me)" is a popular song written by Irving Berlin and published in 1950. It was featured in the 1950 Broadway musical play, Call Me Madam, in which it was introduced by Ethel Merman in a scene with Paul Lukas. The 1953 film version also featured the song when it was sung by Ethel Merman and George Sanders.

Recorded versions
 Alberto Semprini, on piano with rhythm accompaniment, recorded it in London on January 25, 1952 as the second song of the medley "Part 2. Hit Medley of Foxtrots from 'Call Me Madam'" along with "You're Just in Love" and "It's a Lovely Day Today". The medley was released by EMI on the His Master's Voice label as catalog number B 10231.
 Nat King Cole - Tell Me All About Yourself (1958)
 Gary Thomas - Till We Have Faces, JMT (1992)
 Bud Powell - The Complete Bud Powell on Verve (1994)
 Moe Koffman - Devil's Brew (1996)
 Stan Getz - The Complete Roost Recordings (1997)
 Bill Charlap - All Through the Night (1998)
 Diana Krall - When I Look in Your Eyes (1999)
 Rosemary Clooney - included in her album Rosemary Clooney Sings the Music of Irving Berlin (1984).
 Bing Crosby - recorded September 21, 1950  and included in the album Bing Crosby Sings the Song Hits from... (1951)
 Perry Como - a single release (1950)
 Doris Day - a single release (1950)
 Art Farmer - Art (1960)
 Chet Baker -The Best Thing For You
 Della Reese - Della Reese at Basin Street East (1964)
 Barbara Lea - A Woman In Love (1955)
 Eddie Fisher - included in his album As Long As There's Music (1958).
 June Christy - included in her album Fair and Warmer! (1957).
 Margaret Whiting - a single release for Capitol Records (1950)

References

Songs written by Irving Berlin
Songs from musicals
1950 songs